U.S. Royalty was a Washington, D.C. based indie rock band, composed of singer John Thornley, guitarist Paul Thornley, bassist Jacob Michael, and drummer Luke Adams.

Biography

Formed from the ashes of a few bands, they spent their first few months in a pink trailer, deep in the heart of Southern Maryland. U.S. Royalty was currently unsigned and released their debut album MIRRORS on January 25, 2011. After playing festivals CMJ, SXSW, and opening for Third Eye Blind for the majority of 2011, the band followed up MIRRORS with their album Blue Sunshine released on January 21, 2014.

In June 2017, U.S. Royalty announced on Facebook that they had agreed to part ways. The Thornley brothers created a new band called Born Rivals, while Jacob Michael will continue work with his Foreign Air project.

Current members
 John Thornley · Vocals
 Paul Thornley · Guitar
 Jacob Michael · Bass
 Luke Adams · Drums

Discography

Albums
 Mirrors (Self-Released, 2011)
 Blue Sunshine (Self-Released, January 21, 2014)

EPs
 Midsommar (Engine Room Recordings, 2009)

References

External links
Engine Room Recordings label website
Official website
U.S. Royalty on Myspace

Indie rock musical groups from Washington, D.C.
Musical quartets